Harry Nelson may refer to:
Harry Nelson (singer) (born 1804), singer and comedian
 Harry Jakamarra Nelson (–2021), Aboriginal rights campaigner, on the committee of the Aboriginal Publications Foundation in the 1970s
Harry L. Nelson (born 1932), American mathematician
Harry Nelson, Canadian participant in the Athletics at the 1954 British Empire and Commonwealth Games
DCI Harry Nelson, a major fictitious character in Elly Griffiths' Ruth Galloway novels

See also
Harold Nelson (disambiguation)
Henry Nelson (disambiguation)
Harry Nilsson (footballer) (1916–1993), Swedish footballer
Harry Nilsson (1941–1994), American singer-songwriter